St. Thomas' Secondary School is an all-boys secondary day school (girls admitted in Form 6) situated in Kuching, the capital of the Malaysian state of Sarawak. It is the oldest school in Sarawak, though the school was originally at St Mary's location back in 1848. The school is the fourth oldest in Malaysia. The students of St. Thomas are called Thomians regardless of gender. It is a government-aided Mission School. It is regarded as one of the best school in Sarawak in a wide range of fields.

History

The Early Years (1848-1882)
 The missionaries, led by a priest-doctor, Francis Thomas McDougall, arrived in Sarawak on 29 June 1848.
 On 5 August, Francis Thomas McDougall opened a Day School for boys in an empty house in town. The Home School was set up when James Brooke asked the Mission to adopt four Eurasian children.
 In September 1848, the Rajah granted land situated east of the town to the mission. The Home School moved there in 1849. The Home School was developed into the two familiar schools in Kuching - St. Thomas' for boys and St. Mary's for girls.
 The Main Building was opened by the Rajah James Brooke on 13 August 1886.
 The new Assembly Hall was opened and blessed on 30 November 1927.
 Building of four Boarding Houses was declared open by Mr. Justice Boyd, the Judicial Commissioner on 10 September 1929.
 Francis Hollis, later Bishop of Labuan and Sarawak, was Principal of the School from 1928-1938.
 The Cambridge Junior Certificate examination was first taken in 1930, while in 1935, School Certificate examination was started.

The Japanese Occupation (1941-1945)
 On the last day of the term, 19 December 1941 Kuching was bombed by the Japanese Air Force. The Japanese Army Landed in Kuching on Christmas Eve and occupied the school compound on Christmas Day.
 During 1941, three to four hundred forced labourers were housed in the school. A swimming pool was built but was never completed.
 Several days before the Australians landed on 11 September 1945 the majority of the Japanese troops left Kuching and the school buildings were left empty. The school buildings including the Principal's House and offices were dismantled by labourers for firewood and for making wash bowls and furniture for sale.

The Post War Years (1946-1962)
 Within three weeks after the Japanese surrender, St. Thomas' School and St. Mary's School reopened as a co-ed school but by 9 January 1946 the two schools separated.
 On 1 May 1947, the restored Main Building was formally opened by the then Governor of Sarawak, Sir Charles Arden Clarke.
 The first post-war Cambridge Junior Certificate Examination was held in St. Mary's School Hall in 1947 and 21 candidates were successful.
 The first edition of the annual school magazine "The Thomian" was produced in 1949.
 The Old Thomian Association was formed in 1951 and Mr. E.W. Howell was elected president.
 In early 1952, the school was separated into Primary and Secondary Departments.
 St. Thomas' day was celebrated for the first time on 6 October 1954.
 The first edition of the school paper "The Square" appeared in May 1955.

Independence (1963-Onwards)
 On 20 September 1969, the Governor of Sarawak, Tan Sri Tuanku Haji Bujang officially opened Datuk James Wong Kim Min Hall.
 On 12 March 1973 then Minister of Education Datuk Hussein Onn, formally declared open the new junior block.
 The Main Building and the School Library was badly damaged by a fire which broke out on the night of 5 October 1979, while celebrations were going on in the town on the occasion of the Rulers' Conference.
 From 1982 onwards, Bahasa Malaysia become the medium of instruction.
 The new Science Block was officially opened in 1988.
 The school celebrated its 150th Anniversary in 1998. In the same year, the new canteen was completed.

2000 - present

2003
 Celebrated the 50th anniversary of 6th Form education in Sarawak.
 Awarded Best STPM results in the country by Majlis Peperiksaan Malaysia.
 Won the national 3K Competition.

2004
 Awarded best STPM results in the country by Majlis Peperiksaan Malaysia.
 Won the state Level 'Sekolah Harapan'.
 Won the PBSS Gold Award.

2005
 Won the national level 'Sekolah Harapan' award
 Second placing in the State Civil Service Quality Award
 Won the 'Sekolah Paling Cemerlang' award and Mr. Peter Foo Chee Hui (1996-early 2006) won the 'Pengetua Paling Cemerlang' award. Both awards were awarded under the category of 'Anugerah Khas Ketua Menteri Sarawak'

2006
 Given recognition as a 'Sekolah Lestari' and won the national level 'River Care Award'.
 The Running Track was officiated and blessed by the Bishop, Datuk Made Katib.

2007
 Won the 'Healthy School' award.

2008
 Celebrated the 160th Anniversary in July.
 Featured in commemorative stamps and first day cover on 'Premier Schools of Malaysia' together with 3 other schools in the country on 16 December 2008 (Premier School).

School Projects:
The school is embarking on a project to make repairs on the Main Block which require extensive repairs. This block has been recognised as a heritage building.

Gallery

National secondary schools in Malaysia
Secondary schools in Sarawak
Buildings and structures in Kuching
1848 establishments in Sarawak